Noël Delberghe (25 December 1897 in Tourcoing – 17 September 1965) was a French water polo player who competed in the 1924 Summer Olympics. He was part of the French team which won the gold medal. He played all four matches and scored one goal.

See also
 France men's Olympic water polo team records and statistics
 List of Olympic champions in men's water polo
 List of Olympic medalists in water polo (men)

References

External links
 

1897 births
1965 deaths
Sportspeople from Tourcoing
French male water polo players
Olympic gold medalists for France
Olympic water polo players of France
Water polo players at the 1924 Summer Olympics
Olympic medalists in water polo
Medalists at the 1924 Summer Olympics
19th-century French people
20th-century French people